John W. Regoli (born June 4, 1938) is a former Democratic member of the Pennsylvania State Senate, serving from 1987 to 1990.

Following his electoral defeat in 1990, Regoli was appointed by Pennsylvania Governor Robert P. Casey to be his special assistant for southwestern Pennsylvania affairs.

References

Democratic Party Pennsylvania state senators
Living people
1938 births